Fazal Inayat-Khan (July 20, 1942 – September 26, 1990), also known as Frank Kevlin, was a psychotherapist and poet who led the Inayati Order from 1968 to 1982.

He was the author of Old Thinking, New Thinking: The Sufi prism (1979) and, published in Dutch, Modern soefisme: over creatieve verandering en spirituele groei (Modern Sufism: about creative change and spiritual growth) (1992).

Life and career

Born in Montélimar, Vichy France to a Dutch mother and the composer, Hidayat Inayat Khan, Khan was brought up speaking Hindi, Dutch, English and French. His grandfather was Inayat Khan. His aunt was Noor Inayat Khan. Fazal Inayat-Khan is buried at the Oud Eik en Duinen cemetery in The Hague.

Khan found work as a poet, psychotherapist and publisher. Finding that his family name influenced people's perception of his work, he changed his name legally to Frank Kevlin. As an early promoter of Neuro Linguistic Programming, he was the main motivating force behind the creation of the Association for Neuro Linguistic Programming.

From 1968 to 1982 he was head of the Inayati Order, a movement started by his grandfather and kept in the family. He held that Sufism has three aspects: it is non-definitive, inclusive, and experiential –

non-definitive because the real exists without needing to be defined;
inclusive because it is found in all religions and accepts any form of worship or meditative practice that is appropriate to the moment;
experiential because it goes beyond theology and second-hand spiritual experience, accepting the possibility of direct revelation.

Works

Quotations

"Sufism has always changed, and that's why it is always the same."

"Sufism is a call, a cry to awaken, to the minds who are ready, to the human beings who have slept enough, but to those who still want to sleep, it is merely a lullaby along in their dream."

"... minds are not made to agree, but to express beauty ..."

"Reality is a symbol."

Notes

1942 births
1990 deaths
Sufi organizations
Ināyati Sufis
Neuro-linguistic programming writers
Psychotherapists
Sufi psychology